International Aviation Services Limited, trading as IAS Cargo Airlines from 1975, is a defunct wholly privately owned, independent British airline that was based at London Gatwick Airport in the United Kingdom. It commenced operations in 1967 and went bankrupt in 1980, following a merger with London Stansted based Trans Meridian Air Cargo (TMAC) to form the short-lived British Cargo Airlines.

History

Beginning
International Aviation Services Ltd was an air transport consultancy formed in 1966. It commenced worldwide cargo charters from London Gatwick in 1967 with leased, second-hand Bristol Britannia 300F turboprop equipment. It began replacing leased equipment with its own aircraft in 1971, acquired its own air operator's certificate in June 1972 in the name of International Aviation Services (UK) Ltd and adopted the IAS Cargo Airlines trading name four years later.

Commercial development
IAS Cargo Airlines acquired additional, second-hand Britannia turboprop freighters as well as a Canadair CL-44 "swing tail" freighter during the early 1970s to expand its fleet in response to growing worldwide demand for its pure freight services.

Becoming a jet operator
When the world's major scheduled airlines began re-equipping their fleets with new generation widebodied jet aircraft from the early 1970s, a growing number of older generation, narrow-bodied jet planes, such as the Boeing 707 and the Douglas DC-8, became available on the second-hand market at prices smaller airlines that were lacking the resources to invest in new equipment could afford.

IAS Cargo Airlines became one of these smaller airlines that took advantage of this situation by purchasing its first DC-8-50F jet freighter in 1974. Jet operations commenced the following year. As business continued to expand, it introduced further DC-8-50Fs into its fleet during the second half of the 1970s.

By the end of the 1970s the company's fleet mainly consisted of DC-8-50Fs. By that time it was receiving a growing number of air freight consignments that were shipped to its Gatwick base from the "other side" of the Channel. In October 1978 the firm introduced its first larger capacity, "stretched" DC-8 "Super Sixty" series freighter, a -62CF wet-leased from Finnair.

Merging with a rival
Stansted-based Trans Meridian Air Cargo (TMAC), another small independent UK all-cargo operator wholly owned by Trafalgar House subsidiary Cunard Steamship Co, had come into being in 1962. TMAC also operated a similar aircraft fleet consisting of the same aircraft types, including a pair of DC-8Fs. Therefore, combining both companies' businesses to achieve greater operational synergies as well as to attain greater economies of scale seemed to be the next "logical" step to ensure survival in a competitive market place dominated by bigger, more powerful rivals.

IAS Cargo Airlines merged with TMAC on 15 August 1979 to create British Cargo Airlines, which began trading under its new name five days later. The merged entity's fleet comprised 15 aircraft, including eight DC-8 jet freighters, six CL-44-D and one CL-44-0 turboprop freighters. The jets were based at Gatwick while the turboprops were stationed at Stansted.

Closing chapter
The newly created British Cargo Airlines only had a brief life. It folded in March 1980.

Causes of collapse
The main reasons for the combined entity's collapse included:

 A deep recession in Britain, which affected UK-based manufacturing companies that were the airline's main customers. This caused a slump in those companies' output of manufactured goods and led to a collapse in demand for specialist air freight services.
 Steeply rising jet fuel prices in the aftermath of the fall of the Shah of Iran. This increased the operating costs of relatively fuel-thirsty narrow-bodied jet freighters such as the Boeing 707 and the DC-8 (compared with more fuel-efficient widebodied freighters).
 A big influx of long-haul widebodied aircraft capacity into the fleets of British Airways and British Caledonian, Britain's two principal scheduled airlines at the time, as well as their main overseas competitors' fleets during the late 1970s/early 1980s. This resulted in a major increase in bellyhold cargo capacity that cost freight forwarders and shippers less to fill (compared with the higher rates that were required to fill narrow-bodied pure freighters profitably).

Incidents and accidents
In 1977 IAS Cargo Airlines became indirectly involved in a fatal accident causing the loss of an aircraft bearing its name as part of a hybrid colour scheme. This hybrid colour scheme combined parts of IAS Cargo Airlines' livery with that of Dan-Air Services Ltd, one of the leading wholly privately owned, independent British airlines at the time that was the owner and operator of the crashed aircraft.

The accident itself involved one of Dan-Air's Boeing 707-321C freighters (registration G-BEBP), which IAS Cargo Airlines had operated under a so-called "wet lease" arrangement with Dan-Air, whereby the latter was providing the aircraft as well as flight deck crews and maintenance support under contract to the former. The aforesaid aircraft crashed on 14 May 1977 during the final approach to Lusaka Airport at the end of a non-scheduled all-cargo flight from London Heathrow via Athens and Nairobi when its right-hand horizontal stabiliser separated as a result of metal fatigue, causing a loss of pitch control and killing all six occupants.

Some air accident databases wrongly cite IAS Cargo Airlines as the operator of the aircraft involved in this accident despite Dan-Air being that aircraft's actual operator.

A major industry debate on the maintenance requirements as well as service life limitations of high-time "geriatric" jets ensued as a result of this accident.

(For further details see 1977 Dan-Air Boeing 707 crash.)

Code data
Former IATA code: FF
Former ICAO code:
Former callsign:

See also
 List of defunct airlines of the United Kingdom

Notes and Citations
Notes

Citations

References
  (World Airline Directory, 1967–1980)

Further reading
  (Aircraft Illustrated online)

External links
www.airlinehistory.co.uk The World’s Airlines, past, present & future by David Lyall - IAS Cargo Airlines and British Cargo Airlines
Photograph of DC-8-62F aircraft model displaying IAS Cargo Airlines' contemporary 1970s livery
Aviation Safety's accident database

Defunct airlines of the United Kingdom
Airlines established in 1966
Airlines disestablished in 1980
1966 establishments in England
Cargo airlines of the United Kingdom
1980 disestablishments in England
British companies established in 1966
British companies disestablished in 1980
Defunct cargo airlines